River authorities  controlled land drainage, fisheries and river pollution in rivers, streams and inland waters in England and Wales between 1965 and 1973.

Background
A royal commission, with Lord Bledisloe acting as its chairman, reported on the state of land drainage legislation covering England and Wales on 5 December 1927. It concluded that existing laws were "vague and ill-defined, full of anomalies, obscure, lacking in uniformity, and even chaotic." It recommended the creation of catchment boards with responsibility for main rivers, and formed the basis for the Land Drainage Act 1930, although only 47 of the 100 catchment boards suggested by the commission were enshrined in the legislation.

The River Boards Act 1948 sought to establish river boards throughout the whole of England and Wales, with overall responsibility for land drainage, fisheries and river pollution. Thirty-two river boards inherited the functions of the existing catchment boards, or took over the flood prevention functions on main rivers from local authorities where no catchment board existed. The exceptions were the River Thames Catchment Board and the Lee Conservancy Catchment Board, which continued to exist under the powers of the 1930 Act.

Water Resources Act 1963
River authorities were created by the Water Resources Act 1963 (1963 C. 38), which became law on 31 July 1963. Under its provisions, twenty-seven river authorities replaced the 32 river boards on 1 April 1965, and the 1948 Act was repealed. The new authorities took over the powers of the existing river boards, and were given additional duties to monitor water quality and protect water resources. They thus became responsible for inland waters and the underground strata which existed within their area. The Act made special provision for the River Thames and Lee Conservancy catchment boards, enabling them to act as if they were river authorities and their catchment areas were river authority areas. There was also special provision for parts of London, defined as the London excluded area under section 125 of the Act.

For the twenty-seven authorities, the members were partly nominated by local authorities and partly appointed by the government. Each authority normally consisted of between 21 and 31 members, although more could be specified in particular cases by the minister issuing the establishing order for the authority. Local authorities could appoint sufficient members so that they just had a majority. The remainder were appointed by the Minister for Agriculture, Fisheries and Food, and consisted of people who had expertise in land drainage or sea defenses, fisheries, agriculture, public water supply, and industry other than agriculture. The areas of the authorities were in most cases defined by reference to maps held by the river boards they replaced.

The river authorities were abolished on 1 April 1974, with their powers and duties passing to regional water authorities established by the Water Act 1973.

Bibliography

References

External links
Trent River Authority and predecessors (University of Nottingham)

Environmental agencies in the United Kingdom
Defunct public bodies of the United Kingdom
Defunct environmental agencies